"This Is Me" is a song performed by Keala Settle for the film The Greatest Showman. It was released on October 26, 2017, by Atlantic Records as a promotional single from The Greatest Showman: Original Motion Picture Soundtrack and the official lead single on December 8, 2017. It won the Golden Globe Award for Best Original Song at the 75th Golden Globe Awards and was nominated for an Academy Award for Best Original Song at the 90th Academy Awards, but lost to "Remember Me" from the film Coco. It was later nominated for the Grammy Award for Best Song Written for Visual Media at the 61st Annual Grammy Awards.

Following the film's global release, the song charted within the top five in the United Kingdom, the top ten in Australia, Ireland, Malaysia, and South Korea and the top twenty in Belgium (Flanders) and New Zealand.

Live performances 
The song was first previewed by Hugh Jackman in Australia during his 2015 Broadway to Oz tour. Keala Settle performed "This Is Me" live at Vision Australia's Carols by Candlelight at the Sidney Myer Music Bowl in Melbourne, Australia on December 24, 2017. She also performed at the Carols by Candlelight Rehearsal on December 23, 2017, and followed up with an encore performance. Settle performed the song live on The Graham Norton Show on February 9, 2018. Later she performed on The Ellen DeGeneres Show on February 21, 2018. She also performed the song at the 90th Academy Awards ceremony on March 4, 2018. It was also performed live at the closing ceremony of the 2019 Special Olympics World Summer Games in Abu Dhabi, United Arab Emirates.

Track listings

Charts

Weekly charts

Year-end charts

Decade-end charts

Certifications

Accolades

Kesha version 

Kesha's version of the song was released on December 22, 2017. It had charted in Australia at number 71. This cover is included on the track listing of The Greatest Showman: Reimagined (2018), along with a remix that incorporates elements from both versions by Settle and Kesha, along with rapper Missy Elliott.

Music video 
A music video of the Reimagined Remix was released on December 20, 2018. In support of the VH1 Save the Music Foundation, the video features the men from the Netflix series, Queer Eye, Antoni Porowski, Jonathan Van Ness, Tan France, and Bobby Berk (Karamo Brown does not appear in the video), helping three students, Olivia, Timmy, and J'Shawn, and giving them a "Much More Than a Makeover" experience and help prepare them for a talent show shown at the end of the video. At the talent show, Timmy raps Missy Elliott's second verse while the song is played over him, then J'Shawn showcases his dance moves, and finally Olivia sings the bridge to the song and all three are met with praise. The video was directed by Jared Hogan.

Charts and certifications

Weekly charts

Certifications

Release history

References

2017 singles
2017 songs
Keala Settle songs
Atlantic Records singles
Best Original Song Golden Globe winning songs
Kesha songs
Missy Elliott songs
Song recordings produced by Greg Wells
Songs from Pasek and Paul musicals
Songs from The Greatest Showman
Songs written by Benj Pasek
Songs written by Justin Paul (songwriter)